Vanderbeck House is a historic house located in Mahwah, Bergen County, New Jersey, United States. Built in 1760, it was added to the National Register of Historic Places on January 10, 1983.

See also
National Register of Historic Places listings in Bergen County, New Jersey

References

Houses on the National Register of Historic Places in New Jersey
Houses completed in 1760
Houses in Bergen County, New Jersey
Mahwah, New Jersey
National Register of Historic Places in Bergen County, New Jersey
New Jersey Register of Historic Places